This is a list of the most-produced rotorcraft. Production runs typically include variants and licensed production. Aircraft still in production are highlighted in blue.

See also 
List of most-produced aircraft
List of rotorcraft

References

External links 
 Aircraft production runs

Rotorcraft, most-produced
Most-produced rotorcraft
Rotorcraft